This is a list of popular science mass media outlets.
 

 ABC Science – website owned by Australian Broadcasting Corporation
 Archibald Higgins –  science comics series
 Are We Alone? – Seth Shostak science radio program
 Ask A Biologist – audio podcast program and website
 BBC Focus – magazine
 BBC Horizon – TV series
 BBC Science & Nature – latest news in nature and science
 BBC Sky at Night – a monthly magazine about astronomy aimed at amateur astronomers
 BEYOND: Center for Fundamental Concepts in Science – website of Arizona State University
 British Science Association – providing all ages learning about the sciences; advancing public understanding; thought-provoking its many implications
 CASW: Council for the Advancement of Science Writing – increasing public understanding of science
 CBS News – Science 60 Minutes: Health/Science Nature This Morning: HealthWatch Evening News: Health Sunday Morning: Nature
 Cosmos Magazine – Australian magazine
 Cosmos: A Personal Voyage – 1980 television series by Carl Sagan, with its companion book
 Cosmos: A Spacetime Odyssey – 2014 television hosted by Neil deGrasse Tyson based on the 1980 Carl Sagan series
 Daily Planet – Canadian television series
 Discover – magazine
 Discovery – BBC World Service radio programme and podcasts
 Discovery Channel' – cable/satellite television channel
 Edge – online magazine exploring scientific and intellectual ideas
 Exploratorium – museum in San Francisco
 Frontiers of Science – comic strip
 Guru Magazine – digital 'science-lifestyle' magazine
 HowStuffWorks – website
 Inside Science – BBC Radio 4 news stories keeping the audience abreast of important breakthroughs in science
 Inside Science (AIP) – syndicating research news and related topics for general audiences through the press, the TV, and the web
 Institute of Making – materials science and technology from many different perspectives
 ITV Science News – videos, stories, and the latest live updates
Knowing Neurons – a website featuring neuroscience articles, infographics, artwork, and videos
 Leading Edge – BBC Radio 4 series explores the world of science, people, passions & policies; final edition celebrating Darwin's 150th anniversary
 The Life Scientific – Jim Al-Khalili talks to leading scientists about their life and work (BBC Radio 4)
 Little Atoms – weekly chat show on Resonance104.4FM in London; also podcasts
 LiveScience – syndicating major news outlets with an online news-magazine format
 Material World – weekly science magazine on BBC Radio 4
 MITnews:science – Massachusetts Institute of Technology's recent news, featured stories, and videos
 MIT Technology Review – a magazine with authoritative journalism in clear simple language
 Mr Science Show – radio show and podcast from China Radio International
 MythBusters – American TV series that seeks to confirm or debunk science-related stories, urban legends, viral videos, etc.
 The Naked Scientists – audience-interactive radio talk show
 NASA – news, images, videos, TV, and interactive features from the unique perspective of America's space agency
 National Geographic Society – one of the largest non-profit scientific and educational institutions in the world
 Natural History – the magazine of the American Museum of Natural History
 Natural History Museum (London) – "Nature online – explore the natural world"
 The Nature of Things - CBC Television program
 NBC News – Science Technology Health
 New Scientist – magazine
 NHS choices – UK health "Behind the Headlines ¬ Your guide to the science that makes the news"
 Nova – television show on PBS; PBS Science & Nature PBS NewsHour: Science and the Nova ScienceNow TV spinoff
 Nova: science in the news – Australian Academy of Science making accessible, and looking behind the headlines
 Ologies with Alie Ward – weekly podcast
 The Periodic Table of Videos – a series of YouTube videos featuring chemistry professor Martyn Poliakoff
 PLOS: Public Library of Science – available to every scientist, physician, educator, and citizens at home, in school, or in a library
 Plus – popular maths online magazine featuring the beauty and the practical; diverse topics such as art, medicine, cosmology, sport, puzzles & games
 Popular Mechanics – magazine
 Popular Science – magazine
 Popular Science Historic Film Series – short films
 Quirks & Quarks – Canadian radio show and podcast on CBC Radio; CBCnews Technology & Science
 Quo – Spanish-language magazine
 Radiolab – listen, read, watch; imaginative use of radio and podcast making science accessible to broad audiences
 The Ri Channel – the Royal Institution, showcasing science videos from around the web
 Science – journal of the American Association for the Advancement of Science
 Science (TV network) – cable/satellite television channel
 ScienceBlogs – some of the best-known independent science bloggers within ten subject channels
 science fantastic – Michio Kaku radio program
 Science Friday – American radio show on NPR; NPR Science
 The Science Hour – BBC World Service radio programme weekly digest of Discovery, Click, Health Check and Science in Action and podcasts
 Science Illustrated – a popular magazine with editions in other languages
 Science in Action (radio program) – long-running weekly broadcast on BBC World Service
 Science Museum (London) – "Online Science"
 Science News – magazine
 Science Niblets – online magazine
 Science World (magazine) – especially educating children and covering many aspects
 Scientific American – magazine
 Seed – magazine
 Smithsonian – a magazine published by the Smithsonian Institution
 Startalk Radio – hosted by Neil deGrasse Tyson
 Technologist – magazine and website published by the EuroTech Universities Alliance
 This Week in Science – American radio show and podcast
 Through the Wormhole – documentary television series with Morgan Freeman
 VOA News – Voice of America's latest news in science and technology and VOA's Science World
 WIRED – WIRED Science WIRED Science Blogs WIRED UK Science
 ZSL: Institute of Zoology (London) – "Latest News from Science"

 Science media

 Science in the headlines

News online

 ABC (aus)
 ABC (usa)
 BBC
 CBC
 CBS
 ITV
 Motherboard (Vice Media)
 NBC
 NPR
 PBS
 VOA
 The Daily Beast
 Huffington Post
 International Business Times
 Newser
 Slate
 Spiked
 US News & World Report
 Ciencia del Sur

News agencies
 Associated Press
 EurekAlert! (AAAS)
 Reuters

 Press
 Remember Newspaper Science Sections? They’re Almost All Gone Christopher Zara, International Business Times

Daily newspapers

 The Australian
 Chicago Tribune
 The Globe and Mail
 The Guardian
 The Independent
 Los Angeles Times
 The New York Times
 The New Zealand Herald
 The Philadelphia Inquirer
 The Sydney Morning Herald
 The Telegraph
 The Times
 The Times of India
 USA Today
 The Washington Post

Weeklies

 The Economist
 Maclean's
 The Nation
 New Statesman
 Newsweek
 The New Yorker
 The Spectator
 Time
 The Week

Fortnightlies
 Frontline
 National Review
 New Republic

Monthlies
 The Atlantic
 Prospect

Bimonthlies
 Harvard Magazine
 Mother Jones

See also

List of science magazines
List of science books

References

Popular science
Science-related lists